Justice Vineet Kothari (born: 2 September 1959) is an Indian Judge who is now a designated Senior Advocate practising at Supreme Court of India . He is former Acting Chief Justice of Gujarat High Court. He is Former Judge of Madras High Court, Karnataka High Court and Rajasthan High Court.

Career
He born in a Jain family of chartered accountants. He completed B.Com.(Hons.) from Jodhpur university in 1978. After practising as a chartered accountant for 26 years, he served with distinction the Income Tax Appellate Tribunal for 15 years from 1989 to 2004. He was not the member of income tax appellate tribunal rather his elder brother Mr. B M kothari was member of income tax appellate tribunal.

He was elevated as Judge of Rajasthan High Court on 13 June 2005. Transferred as Judge of Karnataka High Court on 18 April 2016. Transferred as Judge of Madras High Court on 23 November 2018. Transferred as Judge of Gujarat High Court on 4 January 2021. Appointed as Acting Chief Justice of Gujarat High Court on 31 August 2021 consequent upon the appointment of Justice Vikram Nath as a Judge of Supreme Court of India. He was retired on 1 September 2021.

References 

21st-century Indian judges
Chief Justices of the Madras High Court
Living people
1959 births